Benjamin Thomas Jr. (born July 2, 1961) is a former defensive lineman in the National Football League who played for the Green Bay Packers, the New England Patriots, the Pittsburgh Steelers, the Atlanta Falcons and the Los Angeles Rams.  Thomas played collegiate ball for Auburn University before being drafted by the New England Patriots in the 2nd round of the 1985 NFL Draft.  He played professionally in the NFL for 5 seasons and retired in 1991.

References

1961 births
Living people
People from Turner County, Georgia
Players of American football from Georgia (U.S. state)
American football defensive ends
American football defensive tackles
Auburn Tigers football players
New England Patriots players
Green Bay Packers players
Pittsburgh Steelers players
Atlanta Falcons players
Los Angeles Rams players
Auburn High School (Alabama) people